Madhe Ghat is located in Maharashtra state India around 62 km south west of Pune bordering Raigad district and in the vicinity of Torna Fort, Rajgad, Raigad Fort and backwaters of Bhatghar dam. The name of this waterfall is Laxmi Waterfall. It is about 850 meters above sea level and situated in dense forests behind Torna Fort. From this place, you can have a view of vast area such as Raigad fort, Lingana, Varandha ghat and Shivthar Ghal. 

In history, when the warrior Tanaji Malusare died in the Sinhagad battle, his body was to be taken for last rites in his native village Umrathe near Poladpur. Tanaji Malusare's funeral procession was taken to his native place from this Madhe ghat route.

From Madhe Ghat there is walkable way to Birwadi. Also at the bottom of the Madhe ghat there is small temple of lord Shiva with small water tank called as "Dev Take". Also you can see one more water fall and historical way at the middle of the right adjacent hill called as "Boratyachi Nal" which was used by Chatrapati Shivaji's army to go towards Kokan area. This area has become a famous spot for trekking.

References

Geography of Pune district